Edna Padilla Sanchez is a Filipino politician who currently serves as the mayor of Santo Tomas since 2013 and previously from 2004 until 2010. She was also the substitute candidate for governor in 2010 after her husband Armando Sanchez died on April 27; she eventually lost to incumbent Governor Vilma Santos.

Sanchez advocated for the successful cityhood of this town, thus making her as the first city mayor after its plebiscite in 2019. 

She was married to Armando Sanchez, a former governor of Batangas and mayor of Santo Tomas; they had four children.

References

|-

Women mayors of places in the Philippines
21st-century Filipino politicians
Living people
Year of birth missing (living people)
United Nationalist Alliance politicians
Nacionalista Party politicians